Evan Hodgson (born 14 September 1998) is an English rugby league footballer who plays as a  for the Sheffield Eagles in the Betfred Championship.

Hodgson has spent time on loan from Bradford at Doncaster in the Betfred Championship.

Background
Hodgson was born in Leeds, West Yorkshire, England.

He is a product of the Bradford Bulls Academy system.

Playing career

Bradford Bulls
2017 - 2017 Season

Hodgson featured in the pre-season friendlies against Huddersfield Giants and Keighley Cougars.

Evan featured in Round 10 (Halifax R.L.F.C.) to Round 13 (Sheffield Eagles). Hodgson also featured in the Championship Shield Game 5 (Sheffield Eagles) to Game 7 (Rochdale Hornets). Evan also played in the 2017 Challenge Cup in Round 4 (Featherstone Rovers). He scored against Featherstone Rovers (1 try) and Sheffield Eagles (1 try).

At the end of the season Hodgson signed a 3 Year contract extension with the Bulls.

2018 - 2018 Season

Hodgson featured in the pre-season friendlies against Halifax R.L.F.C., Sheffield Eagles and Dewsbury Rams.

2019 - 2019 Season

Evan featured in the pre-season friendly against York City Knights.

Evan featured in Round 11 (Barrow Raiders). Hodgson played in the 2019 Challenge Cup in Round 4 (Keighley Cougars).

2020 - 2020 Season

Evan featured in the pre-season friendlies against Leeds Rhinos, Dewsbury Rams and York City Knights.

Hodgson played in Round 1 (London Broncos) to Round 3 (Featherstone Rovers). Evan also featured in the 2020 Challenge Cup in Round 5 (Wakefield Trinity).

Newcastle Thunder
At the end of the season he signed for the Newcastle Thunder.

Sheffield Eagles
On 10 Jun 2021 it was reported that he had signed for Sheffield Eagles in the RFL Championship

Statistics
Statistics do not include pre-season friendlies.

References

External links
Bradford Bulls profile
Bulls profile
RLP profile

1998 births
Living people
Bradford Bulls players
Doncaster R.L.F.C. players
English rugby league players
Newcastle Thunder players
Rugby league players from Leeds
Rugby league second-rows
Rugby league props
Sheffield Eagles players